Not in Our Name (NION) was a United States organization founded on March 23, 2002 to protest the U.S. government's course in the wake of the September 11, 2001 attacks; it disbanded on March 31, 2008.

Two key documents
Early in their existence, NION produced two documents—the "Pledge of Resistance" and the "Statement of Conscience"—that NION members believe provide focus and expression to the U.S. anti-war movement.

"Pledge of Resistance"
The Pledge is written by Starhawk and Saul Williams, in the style of free verse, beginning:
We believe that as people living 
in the United States it is our 
responsibility to resist the injustices 
done by our government, 
in our names 

Not in our name 
will you wage endless war 
and concluding
Another world is possible 
and we pledge to make it real.

The pledge opposes what it characterizes as "endless war", "transfusions of blood for oil", invasions of foreign countries, bombing civilians, and killing children. It goes on, "Not in our name / will you erode the very freedoms / you have claimed to fight for." It implicitly accuses the Bush administration of deeming "whole peoples or countries" as "evil" and pledges, among other things, "...alliance with those/ who have come under attack /
for voicing opposition to the war / or for their religion or ethnicity."

The Not in My Name EP was released in May 2003 by Saul Williams with assistance from  DJ Spooky, DJ Goo and Coldcut.

"Statement of Conscience"
NION's "Statement of Conscience", drafted in spring 2002, first lists a series of criticisms of the Bush Administration and (secondarily) the U.S. Congress and calls on the people of the U.S. "...to resist the policies and overall political direction that have emerged since September 11, 2001, and which pose grave dangers to the people of the world."

Among the specific principles advocated in the statement are the right of self-determination for peoples and nations and the importance of due process and dissent. The statement expresses "shock" at "the horrific events of September 11, 2001" but, evoking "similar scenes in Baghdad, Panama City, and, a generation ago, Vietnam", describes Iraq as "a country which has no connection to the horror of September 11", and deplores the administration's "spirit of revenge" and the "simplistic script of 'good vs. evil': "In our name, the Bush administration, with near unanimity from Congress, not only attacked Afghanistan but arrogated to itself and its allies the right to rain down military force anywhere and anytime."

Referring to the U.S. government's treatment of immigrants in the wake of September 11, the statement accuses the U.S. government of creating "two classes of people: those to whom the basic rights of the U.S. legal system are at least promised, and those who now seem to have no rights at all", and evokes "the infamous concentration camps for Japanese-Americans in World War II".

Protesting "a pall of repression" and referring specifically to the USA PATRIOT Act as emblematic of that repression, it accuses the executive branch of usurping "the roles and functions of the other branches of government," and continues, "We must take the highest officers of the land seriously when they talk of a war that will last a generation and when they speak of a new domestic order. We are confronting a new openly imperial policy towards the world and a domestic policy that manufactures and manipulates fear to curtail rights."

NION urges a movement of resistance: "President Bush has declared: 'you're either with us or against us.' Here is our answer: We refuse to allow you to speak for all the American people ... We refuse to be party to these wars and we repudiate any inference that they are being waged in our name or for our welfare ..." It indicates as inspiration "...Israeli reservists who, at great personal risk, declare 'there IS a limit' and refuse to serve in the occupation of the West Bank and Gaza", the abolitionists, and "those who defied the Vietnam war" and concludes, "we will resist the machinery of war and repression and rally others to do everything possible to stop it."

Signatories

NION's web site lists a broad array of signatories to the pledge, listing only those who signed before July 17, 2002. Among those are:

2005 Statement of Conscience
NION issued an updated Statement of Conscience in January 2005, expressing dissent on the occasion of the re-inauguration of George W. Bush as president of the United States.

Slogans
The group uses the following phrases in its rhetoric:
 Not by our will
 Not in our name
 Not by our hearts
 I Say NO to the Bush Agenda
 No War On the World
 No Police State Restrictions
 No Round-ups and Detentions

Controversies

Role in the anti-war movement

A partial parallel for the founding of Not in Our Name (NION) is the founding of the anti-war coalition ANSWER. ANSWER was founded on 14 September 2001, on the eve of the U.S. invasion of Afghanistan, largely by members of the Workers World Party (WWP). NION was founded on 23 March 2002, largely by members of the Revolutionary Communist Party (RCP), which continues to be prominent among its leadership. (In 2005, four years after its founding, the Party for Socialism and Liberation, an offshoot of WWP, became a more prominent influence than the WWP in the leadership of ANSWER.)

Nonetheless, in contrast to ANSWER, NION has a broad set of endorsers and is generally regarded as a cooperative participant in the broader anti-war movement. An October 2002 article by Michael Albert and Stephen R. Shalom in Z magazine is typical among expressions by anti-war critics of the RCP that, despite its origins, NION is a cooperative participant in the movement. After excoriating the RCP for holding various positions that Albert and Shalom find abhorrent, they then write, "Despite these views, however, RCP does not push its specific positions on NION to the degree that IAC does on ANSWER. For example, while the ANSWER website offers such things as ... [an] IAC backgrounder on Afghanistan ..., the NION website and its public positions have no connection to the sometimes bizarre views of the RCP." This is reflected in the wide range of signatories to their "Statement of Conscience".

Also, NION is itself now a member of a broader coalition United for Peace and Justice, founded in October 2002 (a year after ANSWER) by individuals and groups seeking to curb ANSWER's influence in the anti-war movement.

An example of NION's willingness to cooperate came when they postponed their national moratorium against the war to coincide with the March 5, 2003 "Books Not Bombs" student strike called by the National Youth and Student Peace Coalition.

Donation from Larry Flynt

In 2004, Robert Corsini, an organizer for Not in Our Name publicized Hardcore pornographer Larry Flynt's support for one of their campaigns. Aura Bogado, a feminist radio producer and news anchor for KPFK, objected privately in e-mail and asked to be removed from the organization's mailing list. Corsini forwarded his response to Bogado (including a copy of the original private e-mail) to NION national organizers, her employers at KPFK, and to Bruce David at Larry Flynt Publishing. Bogado replied to Corisini in detail on NION's public e-mail list, and participated in a sharp debate over the e-mail list that followed. After Hustler published a series of articles and sexual caricatures attacking Bogado, she made her criticism public in "Hustling the Left", published on ZNet in June 2005. Bogado charged that Leftist leaders were tacitly supporting racism and misogyny by aligning themselves with Flynt, and specifically criticized Greg Palast, Amy Goodman, Susie Bright, and Amy Alkon. The discussion of her article inspired similar criticism of Leftist leaders cooperating with Flynt by feminists such as Nikki Craft and pro-feminist Leftists such as Stan Goff. Shortly after the publication of her article, the Not in Our Name Steering Committee issued a public apology to Bogado and objected to the treatment of Bogado in Hustler.

Antecedents of the name
Prior to the founding of Not in Our Name, other anti-war groups had used the name, including a group of families who were victims of the 9-11 World Trade Center attack, and Jewish youth protesting Israel's policies in the Palestinian territories. "Not in Our Name" is also a slogan used by the UK Stop the War Coalition. "Not in Our Name" has also been a petition drive to be signed by Muslims by CAIR, in which they say it is "not in the name of Muslims" that terrorist leaders such as Osama bin Ladin and Hambali are making these claims.

See also
List of anti-war organizations
List of peace activists

References

External links
 Not in Our Name UK - with special reference to NATO regime change operations against Syria
 Not in Our Name Australia

"Hustling the Left" controversy
 Aura Bogado, "Hustling the Left" ZNet June 5, 2005
 Susie Bright, "A Response to Aura Bogado" ZNet June 9, 2005
 Aura Bogado, "Reply to Susie Bright"  ZNet June 14, 2005
 "To Aura, An Overdue Apology"  Not In Our Name National Steering Committee, ZNet June 17, 2005
 Robert Corsini and Bruce David, "Caught in the Crossfire" LarryFlynt.com Reporter's Notebook August 2005
 Bruce David, "Femi-Nazi Wars Episode Vi: Attack of the Z Ray" LarryFlynt.com Reporter's Notebook
 Nikki Craft, Hustling the Left website (the website was established by Nikki Craft to highlight the issues raised by Bogado's article; it was not created by Aura Bogado herself).

Anti–Iraq War groups
Peace organizations based in the United States
Organizations established in 2002
Organizations disestablished in 2008
2002 establishments in the United States